Sericocoma is a genus of flowering plants belonging to the family Amaranthaceae.

Its native range is Southern Africa.

Species
Species:

Sericocoma avolans 
Sericocoma heterochiton 
Sericocoma pungens

References

Amaranthaceae
Amaranthaceae genera